Bigfish  is a printed ceramic mosaic sculpture by John Kindness. The  statue was constructed in 1999 and installed on Donegall Quay in Belfast, Northern Ireland, near the Lagan Lookout and Custom House.

The Big Fishs image appears on tourism material related to Belfast and Northern Ireland.

Construction 

The outer skin of the fish is a cladding of ceramic tiles decorated with texts and images relating to the history of Belfast. According to the Belfast City Council, each scale "tells a story about the city". Material from Tudor times to present day newspaper headlines are included along with contributions from Belfast school children (including a soldier and an Ulster Fry). The Ulster Museum provided the primary source of historic images, while local schools/day centres located along the line of the River Farset were approached to provide drawings for the fish. Images were provided by Glenwood Primary School, St Comgalls and Everton Day Centres.

The Big Fish contains a time capsule storing information, images, and poetry on the city.

Commission 
The work was commissioned to celebrate the regeneration of the River Lagan. The site is a significant landmark as it is the location of the confluence of the River Farset with the River Lagan (Belfast is named after the River Farset).

The Big Fish was funded by the Laganside Corporation and the National Lottery, through the Big Lottery Fund, through the Arts Council of Northern Ireland.

Gallery

References

See also
List of public art in Belfast

Outdoor sculptures in Northern Ireland
Buildings and structures in Belfast
Tourist attractions in Belfast
Fish in art
Ceramic sculptures
Culture in Belfast
1999 sculptures
Time capsules